Martovka is a rural locality (a selo) and the administrative center of Martovsky Selsoviet, Khabarsky District, Altai Krai, Russia. The population was 877 as of 2013. It was founded in 1920. There are 5 streets.

Geography 
Martovka is located 24 km south of Khabary (the district's administrative centre) by road. Malopavlovka is the nearest rural locality.

References 

Rural localities in Khabarsky District